David Z may refer to:
 David Z (producer)
 David Z. or David Z. Norton, a sister ship of the Robert S. Pierson